Renewable Energy Payments are a competitive alternative to Renewable Energy Credits (REC's).

Although the intent with both methods is the same, to stimulate growth in the alternative and renewable energy space, REP's have proven to offer benefits to local jobs, businesses and economies while making the growth fundable and lendable by financial institutions.

Renewable Energy Payments are the mechanisms or instruments at the heart of specific state, provincial or national renewable energy policies. REPs are incentives for homeowners, farmers, businesses, etc., to become producers of renewable energy, or to increase their production  of renewable energy. As such, they increase our overall production and use of renewable energy, and decrease our consumption and burning of fossil fuels.

In a broad stroke, Renewable Energy Payments, sometimes known as a Feed-in Tariff place obligations on utility companies to buy electricity from renewable energy sources, often small, local companies, for a fixed period of time. The underlying premise being that with fixed payments the once volatile renewable energy projects now become lendable and attractive for financing, thus stimulating growth and innovation.
Proponents of Renewable Energy Payments argue that this policy has proven to stimulate local economies, innovation and small business growth because in its truest form REP's put everyone, whether small business, individual, or farmers on an equal footing with large commercial titans of industry.

Representative Jay Inslee of Washington says "We can give homeowners, farmers and communities across America investment security that they can take to the bank.  We know from experience in Germany, Spain and dozens of other countries around the world that this policy approach spurs unparalleled and affordable renewable-energy development."

The alternative to Renewable Energy Payments are what are called Renewable Energy Credits, which have been likened to the Alaskan Bridge to nowhere in a recent filing by the Florida Alliance for Renewable Energy. (FARE)

References

Carbon finance
Climate change in the United States
Renewable energy policy